David Khinchaguishvili (born 24 July 1982) is a Georgian rugby union footballer.

He previously played in the Top 14 for Aviron Bayonnais. He also previously played for CS Bourgoin-Jallieu, AS Béziers, CA Brive and Racing 92.

Khinchaguishvili is an international player for the Georgia national team, making his debut in a match against Spain in 2003. He played for Georgia in their matches in 2006 that saw them qualify for the 2007 Rugby World Cup. He also played at the 2011 Rugby World Cup.

External links
 ERC Rugby profile
 scrum.com statistics
 lequipe.fr profile
 itsrugby profile

1982 births
Living people
Rugby union players from Georgia (country)
Racing 92 players
Expatriate rugby union players in France
Expatriate rugby union players from Georgia (country)
Expatriate sportspeople from Georgia (country) in France
Rugby union players from Tbilisi
Georgia international rugby union players
Rugby union props